Phillaur Fort or Maharaja Ranjit Singh Fort is located on the Grand Trunk Road in Phillaur, Punjab, India.

During the reign of Shah Jahan (1628-1658) an Imperial sarai was constructed here and in 1809 it was rebuilt as a fort under the rule of Maharaja Ranjit Singh (1780–1839). It was designed by Dewan Mohkam Chand, with the assistance of Ranjit Singh's French and Italian generals. It was constructed as a response to the British, who built a fort in nearby Ludhiana. In 1846 the British took control of the fort following the defeat of the Sikhs at the Battle of Aliwal. The fort remained under the control of the army until 1890 when it was transferred to the civil authorities, who used it as a police training centre. On 6 April 1973 it was renamed as 'Maharaja Ranjit Singh Fort' by the Punjab Government. Since 1981 it has been used as the Maharaja Ranjit Singh Punjab Police Academy.

It also home to Pir Baba Abdullah Shah Ji's Shrine (also known as  Pir-i-Dastgir or Abdul Kadir Galani) and as such local Muslims consider it a holy place. The fort also contains several tombs of Muslim icons and members of Shah Shuja's family.

Architecture 
The fort's architecture has a distinct European character, with channels dug out along the boundary of the fort, watchtowers on the two gateways, four bastions on four nooks high walls around the fort.

Gallery

References

External links
 

Forts in Punjab, India
Monuments and memorials in Punjab, India